is a 1999 Japanese superhero kaiju tokusatsu film produced by Tsuburaya Productions. It is a sequel to the previous year's Ultraman Tiga & Ultraman Dyna: Warriors of the Star of Light and became second in a successful Ultra Series. This film is the only theatrical spinoff of the Ultraman Gaia TV series.

Plot
In a change from previous Ultraman movies, this takes place in real world, in which Ultraman Gaia is just a popular kids' TV show. 
           
A young boy named Tsutomu Niiboshi, is failing in school from his obsession to Ultraman Gaia. One day, while watching an Ultraman Gaia episode, he gets teleported into hyperspace where he sees a girl and behind her a scene of mass destruction. He later sees that same girl, named Lisa Nanase, in his class. Later on, he finds a mysterious glowing ball (Also from the dream) that tells him it can make any wish come true. The one thing Tsutomu wants more than anything else is to meet Gamu Takayama, Ultraman Gaia's human host. After his wish is granted, Gamu actually appears, but a bully takes the ball and makes the second wish; for a monster, Satan Bizor, to fight Gamu. After Gamu transforms into Ultraman Gaia, he finds he is losing power quickly, but manages to defeat the monster regardless. Afterwards, reverting into Gamu, he is chased by kids through the neighborhood until he finally manages to elude them by hiding in a toy shop. Once inside though, Tsutomu and his friends find Gamu and Tsutomu explains to Gamu just how he was brought to their world. Tsutomu tries hiding Gamu in an abandoned hangar, and during this time, Gamu sees that Tsutomu has a present for Lisa, a book called "Gulliver's Travels", which was a favorite of Gamu's as a child. While scanning the ball for the answers, not only do the police find him, but Gamu suddenly finds himself back in his own world, and accidentally takes the book with him. He is soon able to recall the events and checks the data he scanned from the ball, and gets a vision telling him that Tsutomu's world will soon be destroyed.

Unfortunately, during the whole ordeal, Tsutomu loses the ball, and the bully finds the wishing ball and wishes for a giant monster to appear. King of Mons is created and starts destroying their suburban Tokyo neighborhood. Gamu becomes determined to open a gateway between the two universes to stop the monster and save the world Tsutomu lives in. Gamu is soon able to find his way there with the aid of a new mecha, the XIG Adventure, and transforms into Gaia to battle the giant monster. Soon, Gaia is in a deadly battle against the monster. The monster then spawns two more monsters that are equally as strong as the original, one whose specialty is in water and the other whose specialty is sky. Tsutomu, knowing that Gaia is in trouble, tries to wish for help only to be sent flying into the air by one of the monster's stray beams. Just as all seems lost he is rescued by Ultraman Tiga and Ultraman Dyna, who have come via "The Light" into the battle to help Gaia. The three Ultramen battle the monsters. Tiga and Dyna destroy King of Mons' spawns. Gaia manages to obliterate King of Mons with a highly powerful laser blast and saves the day. Gaia then turns back into Gamu and reveals Lisa's secret to Tsutomu: She is the human-interface of the ball. Even though Lisa will disappear forever, she urges Tsutomu to wish for the ball to vanish forever, repairing all of the damage that had been caused by it to that world. Before returning to his world, Gamu returns Tsutomu's book to him and tells him "Thanks to this book, we were able to meet again."

At the end of the film, Tsutomu relives the day Lisa appeared in his class, but is unable to recall the events of this film. During the credits, though, as he shows Lisa the book, there is an autograph and a message to him from Gamu, as he sees the XIG Fighter EX flying through the air before disappearing.

Cast
: 
: 
: 
: 
: 
: 
: 
Teacher: 
Police force captain: 
Police officer in the schoolyard: 
Police officer at the barn: 
: 
: 
: 
Toy shop owner: 
Tsutomu's mother: 
:

Voice actors
: 
: 
PAL: 
: 
:

Theme song
 by  &

U.S. release
This movie was released on Region 1 DVD by Image Entertainment on May 14, 2002.

References

External links
 Tsuburaya Productions - The Official Home of Ultraman (Japanese)
 
 Stomp Tokyo Review

Crossover tokusatsu films
1999 films
Ultra Series films
Ultraman Tiga
Films directed by Kazuya Konaka
Films scored by Toshihiko Sahashi
1990s Japanese films